A canopy formation is a formation built by parachutists by flying their parachutes in proximity to each other and then taking grips ("docking") on other jumpers' parachutes.

The practice of building such formations is officially known as : canopy formations (CF), Former Terms are canopy formation skydiving (CFS) or canopy relative work (CRW or CReW).

In 2012, an eleven-member team of the Indian Air Force achieved a canopy formation involving all members of the team. In November 2007, a 100-person was performed over Lake Wales, Florida. To date, this is the largest such formation ever achieved and recognised as an official F%C3%A9d%C3%A9ration A%C3%A9ronautique Internationale (FAI) World Record. The current FAI European record is a 30-parachute formation built in 2018 in Teuge in the Netherlands

See also 
Formation skydiving

References

Parachuting